Ion Munteanu is a Moldovan politician and businessman.

Biography 

He served as member of the Parliament of Moldova.

External links 
 Cine au fost şi ce fac deputaţii primului Parlament din R. Moldova (1990–1994)?
 Declaraţia deputaţilor din primul Parlament
 Site-ul Parlamentului Republicii Moldova

References

Living people
Moldovan MPs 1990–1994
Popular Front of Moldova MPs
1962 births